The Swiss Women's Super League is the highest-level league competition for women's football clubs in Switzerland. It was established in 1970 (formerly named Nationalliga A).

League winners qualify for the UEFA Women's Champions League. The team that end as number 10 relegate to the Nationalliga B.

The Super League replaced the Nationalliga A as the highest level of women's football in Switzerland from 2020–21 onwards.

Women's Super League teams 2022–23

Format
Starting with the 2010–11 season, a play-off system was adopted. After the regular season, where the teams play each other twice, the top 8 teams play a final round which decides the champion. The two last placed teams and the winners of both Nationalliga B play each other twice. The top 2 teams of that group will stay in the Nationalliga A with the bottom 2 playing in next season's Nationalliga B. Tiebreakers in the playoffs are points and then better regular season standings.

From the 2017–18 season the league was reduced from 10 to 8 teams to increase competitiveness. The eight teams play each other four times. The leading team then is champion.

Even if there were plenty of formats through the years, 2021-22 was the first season in Swiss football history that was decided by playoffs. The completely new format was introduced mainly due to promotional reasons. The number of teams was increased to 10 again. They all face each other twice in a home and an away game. The table after these 22 games is the base for the playoff-quarterfinals where the 1st ranked team plays the 8th, the 2nd against the 7th, the 3rd against 6th and the 4th against the 5th. The 9th and 10th ranked play a relegation league against the two best teams from Nationalliga B. The better two qualify for next season's Super League, the other two will play in the second division.  

All duels of the playoff, relegation, and classification matches are played with one first and one second leg game at each team's home ground. Only the playoff-final is a one-off game that takes place on a neutral ground.

League Champions
The list of all champions:

1971: DFC Aarau
1972: DFC Aarau
1973: DFC Aarau
1974: DFC Aarau
1975: DFC Alpnach
1976: DFC Sion
1977: DFC Sion
1978: DFC Bern
1979: DFC Bern
1980: SV Seebach Zürich
1981: SV Seebach Zürich
1982: SV Seebach Zürich
1983: SV Seebach Zürich
1984: DFC Bern
1985: SV Seebach Zürich
1986: DFC Bern
1987: SV Seebach Zürich
1988: SV Seebach Zürich
1989: FC Rapid Lugano
1990: SV Seebach Zürich
1991: SV Seebach Zürich
1992: DFC Bern
1993: SV Seebach Zürich
1994: SV Seebach Zürich
1995. FFC Bern
1996: FFC Bern
1997: FFC Bern
1998: SV Seebach Zürich
1999: FC Schwerzenbach
2000: FFC Bern
2001: FFC Bern
2002: FC Sursee
2003: FC Sursee
2004: FC Sursee
2005: SC LUwin.ch Luzern
2006: SC LUwin.ch Luzern
2007: FFC Zuchwil 05
2008: FFC Zürich Seebach
2009: FC Zürich Frauen
2010: FC Zürich Frauen
2011: YB Frauen
2012: FC Zürich Frauen
2013: FC Zürich Frauen
2014: FC Zürich Frauen
2015: FC Zürich Frauen
2016: FC Zürich Frauen
2017: FC Neunkirch
2018: FC Zürich Frauen
2019: FC Zürich Frauen
2020: abandoned due to COVID-19 pandemic in Switzerland
2021: Servette FC
2022: FC Zürich Frauen

Performance by club
23 Titles: FC Zürich Frauen (incl. FFC Zürich Seebach and SV Seebach Zürich)
11 Titles: YB Frauen  (incl. FFC Bern and DFC Bern)
5 Titles: SC LUwin.ch Luzern (incl. FC Sursee)
4 Titles: DFC Aarau
2 Titles: DFC Sion
1 Title: DFC Alpnach, FC Rapid Lugano, FC Schwerzenbach, FFC Zuchwil 05, FC Neunkirch, Servette FC

Top scorers
The record for most goals in a season was set by German Inka Grings in 2012/13. She surpassed the previous record of Vanessa Bürki with 28 in 2003/04.

The latest topscorers were:

References

External links
Official Site
Swiss League at women.soccerway.com

  
1
Switzerland
Sports leagues established in 1970
1970 establishments in Switzerland
Women
Professional sports leagues in Switzerland